Alcohol measurements are units of measurement for determining amounts of beverage alcohol.

Beer measures

Liquor measurements

The following table lists common sizes for liquors and spirits.

Liquor bottles

The British Reputed Pint and Reputed Quart were used in Great Britain and throughout the Empire from the late 17th century until the early 20th century. Originally there were different standard gallons depending on the type of alcohol. That meant that the Reputed measures varied depending on which standard gallon was used. A Reputed Pint of beer was equal to 285 mL (1/2 an Ale Pint, or equivalent to 10 imperial oz. or 9.63 US oz.) and a Reputed Quart of wine was equal to 730 mL (3/4 of a  Wine Quart, or equivalent to 25.69 Imp. oz. or 24.68 US fluid oz.).  When the Imperial system was adopted in 1824, the fluid gallon was standardized on the old Ale Gallon (which had 160 fluid ounces). However, Reputed pints and quarts were still used by breweries and merchants, but measurements were now based on the Imperial system. There was still confusion about whether Reputed or Imperial measures was being used by the merchant, so eventually Imperial pints and quarts were made standard in the early 20th century.

The United States adopted the British Wine Gallon (which had 128 fluid ounces) as standard. The laws concerning the production and sale of alcohol stated that it had to be sold in portions of a gallon for tax purposes. A standard case of bottled beer, wine or liquor had to be equal to two gallons and bottles came in half-dozens and dozens rather than fourths (quarts) and eighths (pints). There would be 24 small bottles (Twelfths of a US gallon) or 12 large bottles (Sixths of a US gallon) per case. The bottles were later increased in size (Tenths and Fifths of a US gallon) to be equivalent to British Reputed Pints and Quarts, allowing them to be interchangeable for export. The American liquor industry later referred to these measures as "Commercial Pints" (Tenths) and "Commercial Quarts" (Fifths).

Wine measurements
The following table contains various measurements that are commonly applied to wine.

The 750 mL Standard wine bottle was chosen because it was the standard French wine bottle once moulded glass bottles were available in the 19th century. Previously there was a roughly 730 mL limit to glass-blown bottles because that was the limit of a glassblower's lungs. The volume was rounded up to 750 mL and then was used as the base size for French wine containers, with all subdivisions and multiples figured from it. The rest of the world followed suit with equivalent customary measurement versions of their own (like the British Reputed Quart).     

Following metrication in 1980, American still wines can also be sold in large multi-liter containers, but only in full liters. They are typically sold in glass demijohns or foil bag-in-box containers holding 4, 5, 7, 8, or 10 Liters.

References
 Schott's Original Miscellany

Further reading

"How Many Shots in a Fifth"

External links

Conversion Calculator for Units of Volume
A Dictionary of Units of Measurement
Measurements